Jarrett Ryan Stidham (born August 8, 1996) is an American football quarterback for the Denver Broncos of the National Football League (NFL). After transferring from Baylor, he played college football at Auburn and was selected by the New England Patriots in the fourth round of the 2019 NFL Draft. Stidham spent three seasons as a backup for New England before being traded to the Raiders in 2022, and then was signed to the Broncos in 2023.

Early years
Stidham attended Stephenville High School in Stephenville, Texas. As a senior, he completed 183 of 260 passes for 2,934 yards with 35 touchdowns. He also rushed for 969 yards and 15 touchdowns. Stidham was rated by Rivals.com as a four-star recruit and was ranked as the sixth-best dual-threat quarterback in his class. Stidham originally committed to Texas Tech University to play college football, but later changed to Baylor University.

College career

Baylor
Stidham entered his true freshman year at Baylor in 2015 as the backup to Seth Russell. Stidham appeared in the first seven games, completing 24 of 28 passes for 331 yards and six touchdowns. After Russell suffered a season-ending neck injury during Baylor's seventh game, Stidham took over as the starter. He started his first career game against Kansas State. He finished the game completing 23 of 33 passes for 419 yards, three passing touchdowns and a rushing touchdown. In his second career start against Oklahoma, Stidham injured his back in the first quarter, but he was able to remain in the game. He finished the game completing 16 of 27 for 257 yards, two touchdowns and two interceptions in the 44–34 loss.

The following week, despite being questionable to play leading up to the game, Stidham made his third career start against Oklahoma State. He injured his hand and ankle in the first half of the game and did not return to the field for the second half. On November 25, 2015, Baylor head coach Art Briles announced that Stidham's ankle injury was a chipped bone in the back of his ankle and Stidham would be sidelined for the remainder of the regular season. It was reported that Stidham might be able to return for Baylor's bowl game, but on December 19, Briles announced Stidham would miss the 2015 Russell Athletic Bowl.

In the wake of a sexual abuse scandal at the school, which led to the firing and resignation of much of the coaching staff, and general dissatisfaction backing up quarterback Seth Russell, on July 7, 2016, Stidham announced he would be transferring from Baylor.

Auburn
After spending a semester at McLennan Community College, where he did not play football, Stidham announced that he would be transferring to Auburn University. He made the announcement via his Twitter account on December 10, 2016. On August 14, Stidham was named as Auburn's starting quarterback for the 2017 season. Stidham led the Tigers to an SEC West Division Championship after victories over top-ranked Georgia and Alabama. He would later lose to UCF in the Peach Bowl. On December 4, 2018, Stidham announced that he would forgo his final year of eligibility and declare for the 2019 NFL Draft.

College statistics

Professional career

Stidham was selected by the New England Patriots with the 133rd overall pick, in the fourth round, of the 2019 NFL Draft. He signed a four-year deal worth $3.15 million, including a signing bonus of about $634,000.

New England Patriots

2019
At the end of the Patriots' 2019 training camp, Stidham was named the second-string backup to quarterback Tom Brady. Stidham selected the number 4 as his jersey number, making him the first Patriots player since placekicker Adam Vinatieri in 2005 to wear the number. He was also the first Patriots quarterback to use number 4.

In Week 3 against the New York Jets, Stidham relieved Brady in the fourth quarter while the Patriots held a 30–7 lead. He completed two out of three passes before throwing an interception to safety Jamal Adams that was returned for a touchdown. Following the interception, Brady returned to finish the game, which the Patriots won 30–14.

2020
After Brady left the Patriots in March 2020, Stidham was seen as his potential successor for the 2020 season. However, the Patriots signed former MVP Cam Newton in July, who became the frontrunner to replace Brady. Newton was announced as the season's starting quarterback on September 3, while Stidham became the third-string quarterback behind Newton and second-string backup Brian Hoyer.

Stidham moved up the depth chart when Newton tested positive for COVID-19 amid Week 4, serving as the second option behind Hoyer against the Kansas City Chiefs. Following an ineffective performance from Hoyer, Stidham was brought in during the third quarter to complete the game. He threw his first career touchdown pass to N'Keal Harry, but was also intercepted twice, including one that was returned for a touchdown by safety Tyrann Mathieu, as the Patriots lost 26–10. Stidham was subsequently promoted to the second option ahead of Hoyer.

Although Newton remained the team's starter for rest of the season, Stidham made relief appearances in Week 7 against the San Francisco 49ers, Week 13 against the Los Angeles Chargers, and Week 14 against the Los Angeles Rams. The Week 13 appearance occurred in a 45–0 shutout of the Chargers, while the Week 7 and Week 14 games saw Stidham take over for a struggling Newton amid a 33–6 defeat in the former and a 24–3 defeat in the latter. Despite Stidham replacing Newton in the blowout losses, Patriots head coach Bill Belichick stated after both games that Newton would retain his starting position. Stidham's final relief appearance came in Week 16 after an ineffective performance from Newton against the Buffalo Bills. Entering in the third quarter, Stidham also struggled during the eventual 38–9 loss. He completed four of 11 passes for 44 yards and converted three first downs, one of which resulted from a penalty.

2021
Following off-season back surgery, Stidham began the 2021 season on the team's reserve physically unable to perform list. He was activated on November 9, ahead of the Week 10 matchup with the Cleveland Browns. Stidham was  named the third-string quarterback behind rookie Mac Jones and Brian Hoyer, ultimately not taking the field for the entire year.

Las Vegas Raiders

2022
On May 13, 2022, Stidham was traded along with a seventh-round pick in the 2023 NFL Draft, to the Las Vegas Raiders for a 2023 sixth-round pick. The trade reunited Stidham with Raiders head coach Josh McDaniels, who was the Patriots' offensive coordinator during his three seasons with the team. He was named the second option to starting quarterback Derek Carr on August 30 and was the only backup quarterback to make the initial 53-man roster.

On December 28, 2022, with two regular season games remaining, Stidham was named the starter for the first time in his career after the Raiders benched Carr. In his first NFL start, Stidham threw for 365 yards, three touchdowns, and two interceptions in the 37-34 overtime loss to the San Francisco 49ers.

Denver Broncos
On March 13, 2023, Stidham signed a two-year, $10 million contract with the Denver Broncos.

NFL career statistics

Personal life
Stidham has been married to Kennedy Stidham (née Brown) since 2019. They met as students at Baylor. Brown is the daughter of Harris Blitzer Sports & Entertainment CEO Tad Brown. Their daughter was born in 2022.

References

External links

Twitter
New England Patriots bio
Baylor Bears bio 
Auburn Tigers bio

1996 births
Living people
American adoptees
People from Corbin, Kentucky
People from Stephenville, Texas
Players of American football from Kentucky
Players of American football from Texas
American football quarterbacks
Baylor Bears football players
Auburn Tigers football players
New England Patriots players
Las Vegas Raiders players
Denver Broncos players